The Spokes are an all-female-identifying collegiate a cappella group at the University of California, Davis. They have performed at various a cappella shows, the International Championship of Collegiate A Cappella, and their annual a cappella showcase, HellaCappella at the Mondavi Center for the Performing Arts. 

The Spokes have won several awards at ICCA over the years, including Best Choreography in 2011, Best Beatboxing in 2016, 2nd Place at the Northwest Quarterfinals in 2016, Best Choreography in 2018, and 3rd place at the West Quarterfinals in 2022, and Outstanding Soloist in 2022.

The Spokes also work to capture their sound through their recorded albums and EPs each year, which can be heard on Apple and Spotify Music.

History
The Spokes were created in January 2004 by two former members of the coed a cappella group, the Liquid Hotplates. Co-founders, Jaclyn Cohen and the Grammy nominated country artist, Cam (singer) Ochs, posted fliers around UC Davis to find entertaining and talented students who were interested in forming an all-female group. After several rounds of auditions, there were eight Spokes. They practiced in the music room of the Infill dorms at Davis and in members' apartments.

Performances and Appearances
The Spokes have toured cities in California including Berkeley for the annual West Coast A Cappella showcase hosted by the California Golden Overtones and UC Men's Octet, Los Angeles for the annual California A Cappella Festival hosted by Random Voices, and Claremont for the annual SCAMFest hosted by the Claremont Shades. They also host their own annual shows including "HellaCappella: The West Coast premier A Cappella Showcase", and "LocalTones: An All-Davis, All-A Cappella Concert". In addition, the group goes on a musical and bonding retreat every Winter as well as attending a cappella festivals like SheSings by the Women's A Cappella Association and LAAF.

The Spokes have also been featured on Good Day Sacramento and KXJZ's Capital Public Radio. The Spokes have performed at the California Firefighter's Memorial Ceremony in Sacramento, Davis Idol at Davis Senior High School, the Annual Tree Lighting Ceremony at the State Capitol, and the Fab 40s in Sacramento. 

The group prides itself on its commitment to philanthropy and in the past has donated a portion of their profits to local charities including Daraja Academy and the Women's Empowerment Center in Sacramento, CA.

Albums and EPs

Guiltless (2021) 
All I Got/Havana (Sean Kingston and Camila Cabello)
Pray You Catch Me (Beyoncé)
Cool Girl/Guiltless (Dodie)
Good Thing (Zedd feat. Kehlani)

HellaCappella (2020) 
Sweet Little Unforgettable Thing (Bea Miller)
Fate (H.E.R.)
Norman hecking Rockwell (Lana Del Ray)
Lost in My Boots
Cinderella (Play)
God is a Woman/***Flawless (Ariana Grande and Beyoncé)

Pynk (2020) 
Pynk (Janelle Monáe feat. Grimes)
Technicolor Beat (Oh Wonder)
Don't Stop Me Now (Queen)
Fall in Line (Christina Aguilera)

Goldmine (2019)
Invincible (Big Wild)
Gone (Lianne La Havas)
Greedy (Ariana Grande)
Blow Your Mind/New Rules (Dua Lipa)
Hurt (Christina Aguilera)
Bass Song (Eryn Allen Kane)

All I Need (2018)
Radar (AudioDamn!)
Say (All I Need) (OneRepublic)
I Will Survive (Gloria Gaynor)
Move Like U Stole It (ZZ Ward)

SIN (2017)
I Feel a Sin Comin' On (Pistol Annies)
Focus (Ariana Grande)
Here (Alessia Cara)
Diva (Beyonce)

23 Hours (2016)
 Car Wash
 Ghost
 Like a Boy/Do It Like a Dude
 One Time 
 Nobody Love
 Ain't No Rest for the Wicked
 Boogie Wonderland/Let's Groove/September/Sing a Song
 See You Again

Shades of Pink: Volume II (2015)
 99 Problems
 Say My Name/Toxic
 Figure 8
 Awake Me Up 
 C'mon Talk
 Fleetwood Mac Medley
 Bones
 Man's World
 Unwritten

Shades of Pink: Volume I (2014)
 Wings
 More
 Sweet Caroline
 Never Ever Getting Back Together/Gives You Hell 
 Us Against the World
 Wonder
 I Need Your Love

KaleidoSpoke (2014)
 She Wolf
 Hit Me With Your Best Shot/Just What I Need
 I'll Be Waiting
 Happy Ending 
 Fighter
 Smile
 | 2 |
 That Thing You Doo Wop
 Say A Little Prayer

On The Wall (2011)
 Breathless
 ABBA Medley
 Ridin' Solo
 Top of the World 
 Heartbreaker
 King of Anything
 Seven Nation Army
 She Will Be Loved

Waking Up in Davis (2010)
 Maybe (Ingrid Michaelson)
 Disturbia (Rihanna)
 Signed, Sealed, Delivered I'm Yours/Super Duper Love (Stevie Wonder)/(Joss Stone)
 My Moon My Man (Feist)
 Waking Up in Davis (remake of Katy Perry's Waking Up in Vegas)
 Street Spirit (Radiohead)
 Nothing Ever Hurt Like You (James Morrison)
 And So It Goes (Billy Joel)
 Let Your Love Flow (Petra Haden)
 Annie Waits (Ben Folds)
 Hands (Jewel)
 Alone (Heart)

The Pink Album (2008)
 I Need a Hero
 Street Spirit
 You Don't Own Me
 I'm Yours
 Annie Waits
 Spokehemian Rhapsody
 Cellotape
 Not Myself
 It's Raining Men
 Sweet Escape

This Means Go (2006)
 Hazel Eyes/Sugar, We're Going Down
 In Your Eyes
 My Love
 Have A Little Faith In Me
 It's Raining Men
 Fix You
 Bohemian Rhapsody/Golden Slumbers
 Another White Dash
 Don't Turn Around
 I Can See Clearly
 Gold Digger

Just Ride It (2004)
 Fever
 All this Time
 Ring My Bell
 Fools Fall in Love
 Either Way
 Kiss da Girl
 Bohemian Rhapsody/Golden Slumbers
 Love me Tomorrow

Awards

 ICCA West Quarterfinals (2011) Best Choreography: Kacie Contreras on Top of the World
 ICCA West Quarterfinals (2016) Best Beatboxing: Anya Stewart on One Time (Marian Hill)
 ICCA West Quarterfinals (2016) 2nd Place 
 ICCA West Quarterfinals (2018) Best Choreography: Amanda Beardsley on the entire set Bass Song (Eryn Allen Kane), Hurt (Christina Aguilera), and Greedy (Ariana Grande)
 ICCA West Quarterfinals (2022) 3rd Place
 ICCA West Quarterfinals (2022) Outstanding Soloist: Lyrissa Leininger for Dancing with the Devil

Spokes Alumna
Lyrissa Leininger (2021-2022)
Bonnie Guo (2020-2022)
Kelsey Crist (2019-2022)
Emily Htway (2019-2022)
Makenna Stever (2018-2022)
Shayanti Goshal (2020-2021)
Claire Benoist (2020-2021)
Peleiah Baesa (2019-2021)
Jennifer Wang (2018-2020)
Monica Yuo (2018-2020) 
Ashley Tseng (2018-2020)
Sowbarnika Kanna (2017-2020)
Mathilda Silverstein (2017-2020)
Brooke Talkington (2017-2020)
Gwen Little (2017-2020)
Sarah Kadlec (2017-2020)
Nikki Vallone (2018-2019)
Tanya Kameswaran (2017-2019)
Nelofer Siddiqui (2017-2019)
Amanda Beardsley (2014-2018)
Taylor Muldrow (2014-2018)
Tatiana Boyle (2014-2018)
Kassandra Jensen (2014-2018)
Molly Huff (2014-2018)
Anusha Suresh (2015-2018)
Elizabeth Hall (2015-2018)
De-Vonne Sonuga (2016-2018)
Emily Laskin (2013-2017)
Mary Grafilo (2014-2017)
Crystal Lucio (2016-2017)
Anya Stewart (2013-2016)
Alyssa Gire (2013-2016)
Tanya Rodman (2013-2016)
Miranda Stever (2011-2016)
Lynsie Mason (2012-2016)
Sara Ellis (2011-2014)
Rachel Riley (2011-2014)
Megan Wiley (2010-2014)
Rachel Forer (2010-2014)
Caitlin Sanhamel(2009-2011)
Camille Martinez (2008-2013)
Kayla Ruben (2010-2013)
Emily Korwin (2010-2013)
Mercy Albaran (2007-2011)
Kacie Conover (2009-2011)
Greer Shivley (2007-2011)
Julie Athans (2008-2012)
Kirsten Vincent (2011-2013)
Emily Randall (2009-2012)
Katie Darfler (2008-2010)
Jennifer Pugh (2007-2010)
Sara Scheller (2007-2010)
Meredith Laird (2007-2009)
Claire Krohmer (2006-2009)
Katie Bowen (2006-2009)
Amelia Hassani (2006-2009)
Emily Peña (2006-2009) 
Lena Schiffer(2007-2009) 
Shauna Payyappilli(2007-2008)
Paris Perrault (2005-2008)
Andrea Pasiliao (2005-)
Alexi Elconi (2005-)
Annie Pestolesi (2005-)
Emily Sklar (2005-)
Kate Brody Adams (2003-2005)
Jordan Steiner (2004-)
A.Tianna Scozzaro (Founder)
Alicia Flor (Founder)
Andrea Howard (Founder)
Allie Pedrazzi (Founder)
Katrina Hoo-Soo (Founder)
Elana Segal (Founder)
Jaclyn Fromer (Founder)
Katrina Hoo-Soo (Founder)
Cameron Ochs (Founder)

References

External links
 Website
 Instagram
 Facebook
 Spotify 
 YouTube
 TikTok
 Davis Wiki

Collegiate a cappella groups
2004 establishments in California
Musical groups established in 2004
Musical groups from Davis, California
History of women in California